Vollenhovia emeryi is a species of ant in the family Formicidae.

Subspecies
These two subspecies belong to the species Vollenhovia emeryi:
 Vollenhovia emeryi chosenica Wheeler, 1928 i c g
 Vollenhovia emeryi emeryi Wheeler, 1906 i c g
Data sources: i = ITIS, c = Catalogue of Life, g = GBIF, b = Bugguide.net

References

Further reading

External links

 

Myrmicinae
Articles created by Qbugbot
Insects described in 1906